Tighten Up is an album by American funk band Archie Bell & the Drells, released by Atlantic Records in 1968. The design of the album cover was by Loring Eutemey. Instrumental backing was provided by the T.S.U Tornadoes. Members included Cal Thomas and Will Thomas on guitar, Jerry Jenkins on bass, Robert Sanders on organ, Dwight Burns on drums, Darryl Bursby on sax, Clarence Harper on trumpet, and Leroy Lewis and Nelson Mills on horns.

Track listing

 "Tighten Up (Part One)" (Archie Bell, Billy Buttier) - 3:10
 "Tighten Up (Part Two)" (Bell, Buttier) - 2:48
 "I Don't Wanna Be a Playboy" (Earl Hines, James Bonner) - 3:01
 "You're Mine" (Cal Thomas) - 3:45
 "Knock on Wood" (Eddie Floyd, Steve Cropper) - 2:33
 "Give Me Time" (Sunny Ozuna) - 2:32
 "In the Midnight Hour" (Steve Cropper, Wilson Pickett) - 2:28
 "When You Left Heartache Began" (Bell) - 2:36
 "A Thousand Wonders" (Thomas) - 2:08
 "A Soldier's Prayer, 1967" (Bell) - 2:45

1968 debut albums
Archie Bell & the Drells albums
Atlantic Records albums